Dhalua is a village in Barguna District in the Barisal Division of southern-central Bangladesh.

References

External links
 Satellite map at Maplandia.com

Villages in Barguna District
Villages in Barisal Division